Hilmer is a masculine given name. Notable people with the name include:

 Hilmer Ekdahl (1889–1967), cinematographer
 Hilmer Kenty (born 1955), boxer
 Hilmer Löfberg (1887–1940), diver 
 Hilmer Pettersson, footballer
 Hilmer Swanson (1932–2005), radio engineer

See also
 David C. Hilmers (born 1950), astronaut
 Fred Hilmer (born 1945), academic
 Hilmer doctrine in patent law
 Hilmer Lodge Stadium, in California
 Hilmer Motorsport, German racing team